is located in Hyōgo Prefecture, Japan.

Physical attributes

Sonoda Racecourse is a dirt track, and the track is 1,051 meters in length. It is a right-handed course.

The track holds 17,400 people and has a ¥100 entrance fee.

Notable races

External links
 Official site

References

Horse racing venues in Japan
Sports venues in Hyōgo Prefecture
Amagasaki
Sports venues completed in 1930
1930 establishments in Japan